Bergsøya is an island in the municipality of Herøy in Møre og Romsdal county, Norway. The island is the location of the town of Fosnavåg as well as the Eggesbønes industrial area. The island is connected to other islands via a network of bridges. The Nerlandsøy Bridge connects it to the island Nerlandsøya (to the northwest) and a small road bridge connects it to Leinøya (to the east). The Flåvær islands lie to the south. The  island has a population of 3,558 in 2014.

See also
List of islands of Norway

References

Islands of Møre og Romsdal
Herøy, Møre og Romsdal
Sunnmøre